The St. Michael's Church or simply the Church of Dzaoudzi, is a religious building belonging to the Catholic Church and is located in the town of Dzaoudzi in the French overseas department of Mayotte, in the Indian Ocean.

The church whose foundations date back to 1849, is the Roman or Latin rite and depends on the mission of the Church of Our Lady of Fatima based in Mamoudzou, which in turn is within the jurisdiction of the Vicariate of the archipelago of the Comoros (Apostolicus Vicariatus Insularum Comorensium).

See also
Roman Catholicism in Mayotte
St. Michael's Church

References

Roman Catholic churches in Mayotte
Dzaoudzi
Roman Catholic churches completed in 1849
1849 establishments in France
19th century establishments in Mayotte
19th-century Roman Catholic church buildings in France